Borough Road was a mainline railway station in Southwark, south London, located on Borough Road, close to the location Borough Underground station.

It was on the London, Chatham and Dover Railway (LCDR) and was first opened in June 1864 on the LCDR's City Branch. The line crossed the River Thames and ran up through St. Paul's (now Blackfriars) to terminate in the City of London.

From 1885, following the closure to passengers of Blackfriars Bridge station, Borough Road was the first stop out of central London for trains heading south from St. Paul's.

Ultimately, Borough Road was an early victim of competition from the City & South London Railway's Borough station opened nearby in 1890. Passenger numbers dwindled and Borough Road closed in April 1907, at which time it was owned by the South Eastern and Chatham Railway. Although there is no trace of the platforms, the former entrance to the station still exists below the Southwark Bridge Road viaduct. In 1916, two other stations on the line to the south, Walworth Road and Camberwell, were also closed. Today, main line trains run straight through from Blackfriars to either Loughborough Junction or Denmark Hill, stopping only at Elephant & Castle.

References

Railway stations in Great Britain opened in 1864
Railway stations in Great Britain closed in 1907
Disused railway stations in the London Borough of Southwark
Former London, Chatham and Dover Railway stations